The Hajhir massif is a mountain range situated on the island of Socotra, Yemen. It is the highest point of the island.

Geography
The granite spires of the Hajhir massif are located in the hinterland of Soqotra and are most easily accessed via the valley approaches north of the coastal town of Hadibo. Other peaks of local prominence include Girhimitin, Hazrat Muqadriyoun and Herem Hajhir.

Etymology
The name "Hajhir", sometimes transliterated as "Hagghier" or "Hagher" in English, likely derives from the Arabic "ḥijr" (meaning "stone"). Other possible origins of the range's name include the word "hajar" (meaning "to flee").

The name "Mashanig" (Soqotri: , meaning "the split one"), likely derives from the Arabic verb "inshaq" (meaning "to split"), from which one gets the word "munshuq" (meaning "splittist").

Climbing history
Bedouin goatherds have a long history of climbing in the Hajhir. A 2014 study of Soqotri oral storytelling traditions revealed that a number of popular myths recount ascents throughout the range by local goatherds. According to the anthropologist Christopher Elliott, many accounts demonstrate a strong oral chain of transmission that links mythical characters with actual pre-modern ascents.

See also
 Socotra Island xeric shrublands
 Hadhramaut Mountains
 Sarawat Mountains
 Haraz Mountains

References

Socotra
Mountain ranges of Yemen